(1952–19??) is the seventh 12" vinyl record album by DIY home recording pioneer and one-man band R. Stevie Moore. It was released on Alan Jenkins' Cordelia Records label in the UK.

"You and Me" was included on Moore's 2012 best-of, Lo Fi High Fives.

Track listing
All tracks by R. Stevie Moore

Side Juan 
 "Signal" – 2:50
 "Studio Animal" – :34
 "Jesus Rocks" – 2:56
 "Records" – 1:25
 "The Flavour Is Mine" – 4:33
 "Sox" – 1:08
 "Back in Time" – 4:39
 "Without Cause" – 1:14
 "Treat Me" – 2:43
 "Satisfaction" – 2:59
 "Technical Difficulty" – 2:43

Side Tiu 
 "Genus Lupus" – 0:53
 "Who Needs Girls?" – 4:49
 "Delicate Tension" – 3:43
 "You and Me" – 2:16
 "Jesus Christ" – 1:20
 "Rock 'N' Roll Kit" – 2:26
 "Cassettes" – 1:32
 "Oven Love" – 3:45
 "You'll Never Get Me" – 1:18
 "Goodbye Piano" – 2:22

Personnel 
 R. Stevie Moore – guitar, vocals

References

External links
 Cordelia Records

R. Stevie Moore albums
1987 albums
New Weird America albums